Tyler Miller (born 1993) is an American soccer player.

Tyler Miller may also refer to:
 G. Tyler Miller (1902–1988), third president of James Madison University
 Tyler Miller (basketball), wheelchair basketball player who represented Canada at the 2012 Summer Paralympics
 Tyler Joe Miller, Canadian country singer and songwriter